Games That Lovers Play, released in the US as Lady Chatterley Versus Fanny Hill, is a 1971 British softcore comedy film written and directed by Malcolm Leigh and starring Joanna Lumley, Penny Brahms and Richard Wattis.

The US title and the names of the female lead characters reference the 1748  erotic novel Fanny Hill  and D. H. Lawrence's 1928 novel Lady Chatterley's Lover, which had been the subject of a celebrated obscenity trial in 1960. The film's plot is unrelated to either novel.

Cast
 Joanna Lumley – Fanny Hill
 Penny Brahms – Constance Chatterley
 Richard Wattis – Lothran
 Jeremy Lloyd – Jonathan Chatterley
 Diane Hart – Mrs Hill
 Nan Munro – Lady Evelyn Chatterley
 John Gatrell – Bishop
 Charles Cullum – Charles
 Leigh Anthony – Timekeeper
 George Belbin – Major Thrumper
 June Palmer – Girl
 Graham Armitage – Mr Adams
 Harold Bennett – Photographer
 Sydney Arnold – Butler
 Colin Cunningham – Usher
 Roy Stewart – Mr Bwamba
 Michael Travers – Club porter
 Deborah Bishop – Lothran's fluffer

References

External links

1971 films
1970s sex comedy films
British sex comedy films
1970s English-language films
1971 comedy films
1970s British films